Ravenscrag is a 1981 role-playing game adventure published by Judges Guild.

Plot summary
Ravenscrag is a book that describes a six-level castle and its five story keep and accompanying area, detailing both their rooms and inhabitants.

Publication history
Ravenscrag was written by Scott Fulton, and published by Judges Guild in 1981 as a 64-page book with four large maps.

Shannon Appelcline noted that after Judges Guild lost the use of the name "Dungeons & Dragons" on their products, they began producing books to be used with any fantasy role-playing game system, and "joined the crowd producing "generic fantasy" adventures. Though some of their map books like Castle Book II (1980) and Temple Book I (1981) had opted not to use TSR's trade- marks, the Ravenscrag (1981) adventure marked the official beginning of Judges Guild's "universal fantasy" line. It was published before the end of the AD&D line, showing that the Guild was by now planning for its loss."

Reception
Paul O'Connor reviewed Ravenscrag in The Space Gamer No. 45. O'Connor commented that "If you play D&D or think you can overcome the problems of non-specific text, then Ravenscraft is an excellent buy for the money."

Reviews
 Different Worlds #17 (Dec., 1981)

References

Judges Guild fantasy role-playing game adventures
Role-playing game supplements introduced in 1981